Kim Tae-Jun (born 25 April 1989) is a South Korean footballer who plays as midfielder for Goyang Hi FC in K League Challenge.

Career
He was selected by Busan IPark in the 2011 K-League draft. He made his K-League debut in the league match against Jeju United on 26 June 2012.

He moved to Goyang Hi FC before the 2013 season starts.

References

External links 

1989 births
Living people
Association football midfielders
South Korean footballers
Chungju Hummel FC players
Busan IPark players
Goyang Zaicro FC players
Korea National League players
K League 1 players
K League 2 players